"Sálvame" (English: "Save Me") is the third single released by the Mexican pop group RBD from their debut album, Rebelde (2004). It became a number one hit all over Ibero-America. Anahí sings lead while the rest of the band sing background vocals on the chorus. The song became their third consecutive number-one single in Mexico. On July 22, 2006, the song was used to promote the third season of the soap opera Rebelde.

The song's sequel, "Algún Día", was recorded in 2006 and is featured on RBD's third Spanish studio album, Celestial (2006).

"Save Me" is the English version of "Sálvame" and is featured on RBD's 2006 English studio album, Rebels (2006).  Anahí was the main singer on this later English version as she was on the original Spanish version.

A Portuguese version of this song was released as a single in Brazil with the name "Salva-Me", along with "Solo Quédate En Silencio", on a double A-Side single.

Versions

Chart placings

Music video
The music video was their third to have been directed by Pedro Damián. The video was shot in Canada during filming of the telenovela Rebelde. The band perform the song in the snow, while their castmates skate in the background. Behind the scenes footage were also used in the video.

References

2004 songs
2005 singles
RBD songs
Spanish-language songs
Pop ballads
Songs written by Pedro Damián
Songs written by DJ Kafka
Songs written by Max di Carlo
Song recordings produced by Armando Ávila
Songs written by Carlos Lara (songwriter)